was a district located in Okayama Prefecture, Japan.

As of 2003, the district had an estimated population of 15,872 and a density of 514.32 persons per km2. The total area was 30.86 km2.

Towns and villages
 Nadasaki

Merger
 On March 22, 2005 - the town of Nadasaki, along with the town of Mitsu (from Mitsu District), was merged into the expanded city of Okayama

Former districts of Okayama Prefecture